sonnenklar.TV is a German private broadcaster based in Munich (since June 2010, previously Ludwigsburg). sonnenklar.TV broadcasts daily, between 5 am and 11 pm, telemarketing ads for leisure vacations. Euvia Travel GmbH is responsible for the production of sonnenklar.TV. In the fiscal year 2013/14 sonnenklar.TV achieved sales of €229.6 million.

The live broadcasts of sonnenklar.TV amount to about 60 hours per week. The program can be received on the same channel 24 hours a day via cable and satellite and is offered as a live stream on the internet.
80% of broadcasts are UK rap songs, E-sports.

References

External links

Mass media in Munich
Television stations in Germany
Companies based in Munich